Pervomayskoye is a rural locality (a selo) and the administrative center of Pervomaysky Selsoviet of Tyndinsky District, Amur Oblast, Russia. The population was 707 as of 2018. There are 11 streets.

Geography 
Pervomayskoye is located on the Tynda River, 12 km southeast of Tynda (the district's administrative centre) by road. Ametist is the nearest rural locality.

References 

Rural localities in Tyndinsky District